List of hospitals in Tennessee (U.S. state), sorted alphabetically.

Operating
Ashland City Medical Center
Baptist Memorial Hospital for Women
St. Johns & Mary Specialist Children Hospital
Baptist Memorial Hospital for Women (Memphis)
Baptist Memorial Hospital  (Chattanooga)
Baptist Memorial Hospital (Ripley)
Baptist Memorial Hospital (Covington)
Baptist Memorial Hospital (Huntingdon)
Baptist Memorial Hospital (Union City)
Baptist Memorial Hospital (Collierville)
Baptist Restorative Care Hospital (Memphis)
Baptist Rehabilitation (Germantown)
Baptist Skilled Nursing Facility (Memphis)
Baptist Heart Institute (Memphis)
Big South Fork Medical Center (Oneida)
Blount Memorial Hospital (Maryville)
Bristol Regional Medical Center (Bristol)
Camden General Hospital (Camden)
Centennial Medical Center (Nashville)
Centennial Medical Center at Ashland City
Chi Memorial Cleveland (Cleveland)
Children's Hospital at Erlanger (Chattanooga)
Claiborne County Hospital (Tazewell)
Cookeville Regional Medical Center (Cookeville)
Crockett Hospital (Lawrenceburg)
Cumberland Medical Center (Crossville)
Delta Medical Center (Memphis)
East Tennessee Children's Hospital, Knoxville
Erlanger Health System (Chattanooga)
Erlanger East Hospital
Erlanger North Hospital 
Erlanger Bledsoe Hospital
Emerald-Hodgson Hospital (Sewanee)
Fort Loudoun Medical Center, Lenoir City, operated by Covenant Health
Fort Sanders Regional Medical Center, Knoxville, operated by Covenant Health
Franklin Woods Community Hospital (Johnson City)
Gateway Medical Center (Clarksville)
Gibson General Hospital (Trenton)
Hancock County Hospital (Sneedville)
Hardin County Medical Center (Savannah)
Haywood County Community Hospital (Brownsville)
Hawkins County Memorial Hospital (Rogersville)
Henderson County Community Hospital (Lexington) 
Hendersonville Medical Center (Hendersonville)
Henry County Medical Center (Paris)
Hillside Hospital (Pulaski)
Holston Valley Medical Center (Kingsport)
Horizon Medical Center (Dickson)
Humboldt General Hospital (Humboldt)
Houston County Community Hospital (Erie)
Indian Path Medical Center (Kingsport)
Jackson-Madison County General Hospital (Jackson)
Jamestown Regional Medical Center (Jamestown)
Jefferson Memorial Hospital (Jefferson City)
Johnson City Medical Center (Johnson City)
Johnson County Community Hospital (Mountain City, Tennessee)
LaFollette Medical Center (LaFollette)
Laughlin Memorial Hospital (Greeneville, Tennessee)
Le Bonheur Children's Medical Center, Memphis
LeConte Medical Center (Sevierville, Tennessee)
Livingston Regional Hospital (Livingston)
Lincoln County Health System (Fayetteville)
Macon General Hospital (Lafayette)
Maury Regional Medical Center, Columbia
Maury Regional Medical Center (Spring Hill)
McNairy Regional Hospital (Selmer)
Memphis Mental Health Institute 
Memphis VA Medical Center (Tennessee)
Methodist Medical Center of Oak Ridge, operated by Covenant Health
Methodist North Hospital (Memphis)
Methodist South Hospital (Memphis)
Methodist University Hospital (Memphis)
Milan General Hospital (Milan)
Monroe Carell Jr. Children's Hospital at Vanderbilt
Moccasin Bend Mental Health Institute (Chattanooga)
Morristown-Hamblen Hospital, Morristown, operated by Covenant Health
Nashville General Hospital at Meharry (Nashville)
Newport Medical Center (Newport)
Northcrest Medical Center (Springfield)
North Knoxville Medical Center (Powell)
Parkridge Medical Center (Chattanooga) 
Parkridge East (East Ridge)
Parkridge West (Jasper)
Parkridge Valley (Chattanooga)
Parkridge North ER(Chattanooga)
Parkwest Medical Center (Knoxville), operated by Covenant Health
Pioneer Community Hospital of Scott (Oneida)
Peninsula Hospital, Louisville, operated by Covenant Health
Physicians Regional Medical Center (Knoxville)
Psychiatric Hospital at Vanderbilt (Nashville)
Regional Hospital of Jackson (Jackson)
RegionalOne Health Center (Memphis)
Riverview Regional Medical Center (Carthage)
Roane Medical Center, Harriman, operated by Covenant Health
Saint Thomas Dekalb (Smithville)
Saint Thomas Hickman Hospital (Centerville)
Saint Thomas Highlands (Sparta)
Saint Thomas - Midtown Hospital (Nashville)
Saint Thomas River Park Hospital (McMinnville)
Saint Thomas Rutherford Hospital (Murfreesboro)
Saint Thomas Stones River (Woodbury)
Saint Thomas West Hospital (Nashville)
Skyline Medical Center (Nashville)
Skyline Medical Center-Madison Campus (Madison)
St. Francis Hospital (Memphis)
St. Francis Hospital (Bartlett)
St. Jude Children's Research Hospital (Memphis)
Southern Hills Medical Center (Nashville)
Southern Tennessee Regional Medical Center (Winchester)
Starr Regional Medical Center (Athens)
StoneCrest Medical Center (Smyrna)
Summit Medical Center (Hermitage)
Sumner Regional Medical Center (Gallatin)
Sweetwater Hospital Association (Sweetwater)
Sycamore Shoals Hospital, Elizabethton
Children's Hospital at Erlanger
Takoma Regional Hospital (Greeneville)
Tennova Healthcare - Clarksville
Tennova Healthcare Cleveland (Cleveland)
Tennova Healthcare (Cleveland)
Tennova Healthcare (Lebanon)
Tennova Harton (Tullahoma)
Tennova Shelbyville (Shelbyville)
Turkey Creek Medical Center (Knoxville)
Thompson Cancer Survival Center, Knoxville, operated by Covenant Health
Trousdale Medical Center (Hartsville)
Unicoi County Memorial Hospital (Erwin)
Unity Medical Center (Manchester)
 University of Tennessee Medical Center (Knoxville)
The Vanderbilt Clinic also known as TVC
Vanderbilt Children's Hospital
Vanderbilt Diabetes Center
Vanderbilt Orthopaedics Institute
Vanderbilt Page Campbell Heart Institute
Vanderbilt Rehabilitation Hospital
Vanderbilt Sports Medicine Center
Vanderbilt Stallworth Rehabilitation Hospital
Vanderbilt Transplant Center
Vanderbilt University Bill Wilkerson Center
Vanderbilt University Hospital
Vanderbilt-Ingram Cancer Center
Williamson Medical Center (Franklin)

Defunct
Baptist Memorial Hospital-Memphis (1912-2000)
Baptist Hospital (Knoxville, Tennessee)
Copper Basin Medical Center (Copperhill)
Decatur County General Hospital (Parsons)
Dr. Fred Stone, Sr. Hospital (Oliver Springs, Tennessee)
Gibson General Hospital (Trenton)
Humboldt General Hospital (Humboldt)
Jellico Medical Center (Jellico)
Lakeway Hospital, (Morristown, Tennessee)
McKenzie Regional Hospital (McKenzie)
Millie E. Hale Hospital (Nashville, Tennessee)
St. Mary's Medical Center (Knoxville, Tennessee)
Starr Regional Medical Center (Etowah)

See also
List of hospitals in Nashville

References

External links

Tennessee

Hospitals